The 2016 MBC Entertainment Awards presented by Munhwa Broadcasting Corporation (MBC), took place on December 29, 2016 at MBC Public Hall in Sangam-dong, Mapo-gu, Seoul. It was hosted by Kim Sung-joo, Jun Hyun-moo and Lee Sung-kyung. The nominees were chosen from MBC variety, talk and comedy shows that aired from December 2015 to November 2016.

Nominations and winners

*Jeong Jun-ha and Kim Sung-joo were the Grand Prize initial nominees alongside Yoo Jae-suk and Kim Gura, but after they won the Top Excellence Awards, their names were eliminated as the Grand Prize nominees at the end.

Presenters

Special performances

References

External links 

MBC TV original programming
MBC Entertainment Awards
2016 television awards
2016 in South Korea